People's Party was a political party in the Kingdom of Dalmatia. It was founded in 1861 after the failure of Bach's absolutism, as a branch of the People's Party in Kingdom of Croatia-Slavonia. Its members were known as narodnjaci, aneksionisti or puntari.

Its political goal was uniting Dalmatia with Croatia and Slavonia, stemming from their ideological origins in the Illyrian movement. It also gathered prominent Dalmatian Italians as well as Dalmatian Serbs. However, a Serb faction splintered in 1878, led by Stjepan Mitrov Ljubiša, into the Serb People's Party. From 1887 People's Party was renamed People's Croatian Party, as a result of an internal compromise between the conservative majority led by Miho Klaić and a radical minority led by Mihovil Pavlinović and Juraj Biankini.

It united with the Party of Rights in 1905 into the "Croatian Party".

Notable members

Gajo Bulat
Miho Klaić
Lovro Monti
Vid Morpurgo
Natko Nodilo
Mihovil Pavlinović
Lujo Bakotić
Jovan Sundečić
Konstantin Vojnović
Stefan Mitrov Ljubiša

Diet of Dalmatia elections

1861: 29/41
1864: 9/41
1867: 15/41
1870: 26/41
1876: 30/41
1883: 26/41
1889: 26/41
1895: 23/41
1901: 18/41

References

Political parties established in 1861
Political parties disestablished in 1905
Political parties in Austria-Hungary
Defunct political parties in Croatia
Kingdom of Dalmatia
1861 establishments in the Austrian Empire